Granville is an electoral district of the Legislative Assembly in the Australian state of New South Wales in Sydney's West. It is currently represented by Julia Finn of the Labor Party.

Granville includes the suburbs of Clyde, Granville, Holroyd, Mays Hill, Merrylands, Merrylands West, South Wentworthville and parts of Greystanes, Guildford, Parramatta, South Granville, Wentworthville and Westmead.

History
Granville was first established in 1894, partly replacing part of Central Cumberland.   In 1920, with the introduction of proportional representation, it was absorbed into Parramatta.  Granville was recreated in 1927. It has historically tended to be a  seat.

Members for Granville

Election results

References

Granville
Bathurst, New South Wales
1894 establishments in Australia
Granville
1920 disestablishments in Australia
Granville
1927 establishments in Australia
Granville